The 2013 Salzburg state election was held on 5 May 2013 to elect the members of the Landtag of Salzburg.

The governing coalition of the Social Democratic Party of Austria (SPÖ) and Austrian People's Party (ÖVP) suffered huge losses. The SPÖ lost suffered a swing of almost 16 percentage points, while the ÖVP lost 7.5; despite its losses, the latter became the largest party in the Landtag. The Greens were the main beneficiary of the government's collapse, taking 20% of votes, their best ever result. The Freedom Party of Austria (FPÖ) made modest gains, while Team Stronach debuted at 8.3%.

Despite its losses, the ÖVP led by Wilfried Haslauer Jr. was the clear victor of the election. The party ultimately succeeded in negotiating a coalition with the Greens and Team Stronach, and Haslauer Jr became the new Governor of Salzburg.

Background
After the 2009 election, the SPÖ remained the largest party and Gabi Burgstaller won her second term as governor, forming a coalition with the ÖVP.

After speculative financial investments by the state became known in December 2012, second deputy Governor and finance minister David Brenner resigned. An oversight committee was formed in January to investigate the scandal. Greens leader Astrid Rössler was chosen as committee chairwoman with the support of the ÖVP, over the FPÖ's candidate Friedrich Wiedermann, who was supported by the SPÖ. After concluding its investigation, the oversight committee recommended the dissolution of the Landtag and the calling of early elections. This was pushed by the ÖVP against the will of Governor Burgstaller, but was nonetheless agreed to. The four parliamentary parties agreed to schedule the election for 5 May 2013.

Electoral system
The 36 seats of the Landtag of Salzburg are elected via open list proportional representation in a two-step process. The seats are distributed between six multi-member constituencies. For parties to receive any representation in the Landtag, they must either win at least one seat in a constituency directly, or clear a 5 percent state-wide electoral threshold. Seats are distributed in constituencies according to the Hare quota, with any remaining seats allocated using the D'Hondt method at the state level, to ensure overall proportionality between a party's vote share and its share of seats.

Contesting parties
The table below lists parties represented in the previous Landtag.

In addition to the parties already represented in the Landtag, three parties collected enough signatures to be placed on the ballot:

 Team Stronach (TEAM)
 Pirate Party of Austria (PIRAT) – running only in Salzburg City, Salzburg Surrounds, and Zell am See
 Communist Party of Austria (KPÖ) – running only in Salzburg City and Salzburg Surrounds

Results

Results by constituency

Aftermath
Ahead of the election, both SPÖ Governor Burgstaller and ÖVP lead candidate Wilfried Haslauer Jr stated they would retire from politics if their respective parties failed to place first. On the evening of the election, Burgstaller announced she would resign all political functions. She was subsequently replaced as party leader by Walter Steidl.

Despite its losses, the ÖVP was the clear victor of the election, and Haslauer Jr was the prospective new governor. However, the fragmented parliament promised difficulties in forming a government. He ultimately succeeded in negotiating a coalition with the Greens and Team Stronach. With the exception of Proporz states, this was the first time Team Stronach had joined a state government, with Hans Mayr becoming Minister for Transport, Infrastructure, and Housing. Astrid Rössler of the Greens became deputy governor alongside two other Greens ministers.

References

2013 elections in Austria
State elections in Austria
May 2013 events in Europe